Juuse Tamminen (29 November 1888 – 7 June 1962) was a Finnish writer. His work was part of the literature event in the art competition at the 1948 Summer Olympics.

References

1888 births
1962 deaths
20th-century Finnish writers
Olympic competitors in art competitions
People from Ylöjärvi